Thomashuxleya is an extinct genus of notoungulate mammal, named after famous 19th-century biologist Thomas Huxley.

Description 
Its large skull had 44 teeth in its jaws, including large canines which may have been used to dig around in earth. It had four toes on each foot, and probably walked somewhat like a modern peccary. It was a relatively generalised animal, not specialised for any particular way of life.
There's an almost complete skeleton of this animal in exhibition in the American Museum of Natural History. This skeleton was discovered during the Scarrit expedition to Patagonia, Argentina, that was led by the paleontologist George Gaylord Simpson. Fossils of Thomashuxleya have been found in the Sarmiento and Casamayor Formations of Argentina.

References 

Toxodonts
Eocene mammals of South America
Casamayoran
Mustersan
Paleogene Argentina
Fossils of Argentina
Fossil taxa described in 1901
Taxa named by Florentino Ameghino
Prehistoric placental genera
Golfo San Jorge Basin
Sarmiento Formation